Josh Griffiths (born April 25, 1980) is a Brazilian Jiu-Jitsu practitioner and an instructor of the sport in New York.

Biography
Griffiths began training Brazilian jiu-jitsu in 2001 while also studying Engineering at Stevens Institute of Technology. He first learned of the sport after attending an Ultimate Fighting Championship competition in New Jersey and becoming interested in mixed martial arts (MMA). Griffiths received his black belt in 2007 from Kenny Florian.  Currently, Griffiths owns Clockwork BJJ in New York City's NoHo neighborhood.

Griffiths practices Ashtanga yoga and offers classes at Clockwork BJJ. He is an early riser.

Competitive Summary
    2011 Abu Dhabi World Pro (Canadian Trials) Champion (brown / black belt)
    2011 Abu Dhabi World Pro (New Jersey Trials) Champion (brown / black belt)
    2010 Abu Dhabi World Pro (Canadian Trials) Champion (brown / black belt)
    2007 Pan American Champion (brown belt)
    2005 Pan American Championship, 2nd place (purple belt)

References

External links
 Clockwork BJJ

American practitioners of Brazilian jiu-jitsu
Living people
1980 births
People_awarded_a_black_belt_in_Brazilian_jiu-jitsu